The silversword alliance, also known as the tarweeds, refers to an adaptive radiation of around 30 species in the composite or sunflower family, Asteraceae.  The group is endemic to Hawaii, and is derived from a single immigrant to the islands. For radiating from a common ancestor at an estimated 5.2±0.8 Ma, the clade is extremely diverse, composed of trees, shrubs, subshrubs, mat-plants, cushion plants, rosette plants, and lianas.

The silversword alliance is named for its most famous and visually striking members, the silverswords. The species of the clade break down into three genera: Wilkesia, Argyroxiphium, and Dubautia. There are three species of silverswords and two greenswords in the genus Argyroxiphium, confined to the islands of Maui and Hawaii, and two species of Wilkesia (iliau) on Kauai.  The bulk of the species are placed in the genus Dubautia, which is widespread on all the main islands.

The genus Dubautia contains a wide variety of forms, including cushion plants, shrubs, trees, and lianas.

Similar species frequently occur in the same habitat and are often difficult to tell apart. Hybrids frequently occur between Dubautia species, and between Dubautia and Argyroxiphium.  As a result, there is some disagreement over the number of species, with modern sources giving between 28 and 33 species.

Characteristics
All members of the silversword alliance are perennials, but otherwise occupy a wide range of ecological niches.

Evolution
All Hawaiian tarweeds trace their lineage back to a species of Pacific coast tarweed, very similar to extant species like Carlquistia muirii. Species of Dubautia however have 2n = 14 chromosomes. How the silverswords' chromosome number arose is a matter of some uncertainty, but two major scientific theories have been proposed. One is that two ancestor species, one with n = 6 and one with n = 8 chromosomes hybridized, resulting in a n =  7 hybrid. The hybrid then, by allopolyploidy doubled its chromosome number spontaneously, leading to the resultant and extant 2n = 14 species. Alternatively, the modern chromosome number could have arisen from an ancestor like Anisocarpus scabridus, with a chromosome complement of n = 7, and then arisen by autopolyploidy, instead of needing to first hybridize.

References

Endemic flora of Hawaii
Natural history of Hawaii
Madieae
Plant common names
Flora without expected TNC conservation status